Ruposhi Bangla is a  Bengali entertainment channel which was launched on 31 August 2009 with shows of different categories ranging from reality to socio-mythology, feature films to news updates and from comedy to drama. The channel is a production of Brand Value Communications Limited, Kolkata.

Current Programming
Aji-E-Probhate
Good Evening Ruposhi Live
Chitrageet
Mahabharat

Former Programming
Eki Brinte Duti Kusum
Mohon Baganer Meye
Sri Sri Chaitanya Mahaprabhu (TV series)
Sonarpur Local
Joy Baba Loknath (TV series)
Premer Thakur Sri Ramkrishna
Dadamoni
Prafulla (TV series)
Tota Kahini
Amar Babin
Babusona
Khelaghar
Potol Dangar Tenida
Kolir Gopal Bhanr
Gaan Golpo Arr Gaan
Yugantar
Shomoy
Alor Basha
Matribhumi
Jai Jag Janani Maa Durga
Swami (TV series)
Subhasini
Nadi Dik Hara
Labayna
Ek Poloke Ektu Dekha
Antaheen Adda
Payer Tolar Mati
Bindas Para Dada Boudi
Kakababu O Santu
Francis - Heerer Pahaar
The Super Sunny
Ke Hobe Pujor Byomkes
Sur Taal Loy
Veer Shivaji
Byanjonborno
Dance Pe Chance
Singing Star
Gaan Gaao Taka Naao
Dui Bhuboner Pare
Haat Baralei Bondhu
Meera MBA: Kaajer Maye
Jorse Ladies
Baking News
Maa Shokthi

Drama series
Mohon Baganer Meye
Jao Pakhi
Eki Brinte Duti Kusum
Prafulla (TV series)
Shomoy
Yugantar (TV series)

Ruposhi Sahitya Sera
Swami (TV series)
Indira (TV series)
Nadi Dik Hara

Mythological series
Joy Baba Lokenath
Maa Shokthi
Premer Thakur Sri Ram Krishna
Jai Jag Janani Maa Durga
Sri Sri Chaitanya Mahaprabhu (TV series)

References

External links

 

Television channels and stations established in 2009
Television stations in Kolkata
2009 establishments in West Bengal
Bengali-language television channels in India